Joe Lukasawiecz was a Canadian football player who played for the Hamilton Tiger-Cats. He won the Grey Cup with them in 1957.

References

1930s births
Hamilton Tiger-Cats players
Living people